Marco Wilson (born March 3, 1999) is an American football cornerback for the Arizona Cardinals of the National Football League (NFL). He played college football at Florida and was drafted by the Cardinals in the fourth round of the 2021 NFL Draft.

Early life and high school
Wilson grew up in Fort Lauderdale, Florida and attended the American Heritage School. He committed to play college football at Florida over offers from Miami (Fl.), Georgia, Ohio State and Southern California.

College career
Wilson started as a true freshman and recorded 34 tackles and 10 passes broken up. He was named preseason third-team All-SEC going into his sophomore year but tore his ACL two games into the season and redshirted the rest of the season. As a redshirt sophomore, he recorded 36 tackles, 2.5 tackles for a loss, 3 interceptions and 2 passes broken up.

As a junior, he had a notable incident involving throwing a shoe in a celebratory manner late during a game played on December 12, 2020, against the LSU Tigers, which resulted in an unsportsmanlike conduct penalty that gave LSU a first down. LSU would go on to win the game after kicking a field goal later that drive, beating the Gators 37–34.

Professional career

Wilson was drafted by the Arizona Cardinals in the fourth round with the 136th overall pick of the 2021 NFL Draft. On May 20, 2021, Wilson signed his four-year rookie contract with Arizona.

Wilson entered his rookie season in 2021 as a starting cornerback alongside Byron Murphy. He finished the season with 48 tackles, two forced fumbles, and two passes defensed through 14 games and 13 starts.

In Week 7 of the 2022 season, Wilson had a 38-yard interception return for a touchdown, along with three tackles and two pass breakups, in a 42-34 win over the New Orleans Saints, earning NFC Defensive Player of the Week.

Personal life
Wilson's brother, Quincy Wilson, also played football at Florida and now plays for the Pittsburgh Steelers.

References

External links
Florida Gators bio

1999 births
Living people
Players of American football from Fort Lauderdale, Florida
American football cornerbacks
Florida Gators football players
Arizona Cardinals players
American Heritage School (Florida) alumni